Lin Tsai-pei (born 20 February 1950) is a Taiwanese actor and television presenter. He won Best Actor at the 1985 Golden Bell Awards.

Personal life
In 1988, Lin Tsai-pei married singer-actress Chang Kai-ling (張愷凌), better known by her stage name Tzu Lin (紫琳), after 9 years of dating. They starred in the 1988 TV series Walking Through the Past together. After 7 years of marriage they had a daughter, but divorced shortly afterwards, only to remarry 4 years later. He was charged with DUI in 2004 and 2013.

Filmography

Films

TV dramas

Awards and nominations

References

External links
 Lin Tsai-pei on Facebook
 Lin Tsai-pei on Sina Weibo

1950 births
Male actors from Taipei
20th-century Taiwanese male actors
21st-century Taiwanese male actors
Taiwanese male film actors
Taiwanese male television actors
Taiwanese television presenters
Living people
Chinese Culture University alumni